Jesús Sillero Martín (born 28 December 1995) is a Spanish footballer who plays for CF Villanovense as either a left winger or a forward.

Club career
Born in Seville, Andalusia, Sillero represented Atlético Madrid and Sevilla FC as a youth. He made his senior debut for the latter's C-team on 23 August 2014, coming on as a substitute and scoring a last-minute equalizer in a 1–1 Tercera División home draw against Cádiz CF B.

In July 2015, Sillero moved to CD Cabecense, also in the fourth level. In August of the following year, after scoring 15 goals, he signed for UD Almería, being assigned to the reserves in the same division.

On 6 September 2016 Sillero made his professional debut, replacing fellow debutant Josema in a 0–2 Copa del Rey home loss against Rayo Vallecano. On 2 April of the following year, he scored four goals for the B-side in a 4–2 home win against Atarfe Industrial CF, which included a hat-trick in only 34 minutes.

On 14 July 2017 Sillero moved to another reserve team, Córdoba CF B in Segunda División B. He made his first team debut on 20 September, starting in a 1–4 home loss against CD Tenerife also for the national cup.

On 21 July 2018, Sillero joined Marbella FC still in the third division. The following 25 January, he moved to fellow league team CD Don Benito, being an important unit as his side narrowly avoided relegation.

On 14 July 2020, Sillero agreed to a one-year contract with Recreativo de Huelva, also in division three. Huelva were relegated to the fifth level following league reorganisation.

On 18 June 2021, Sillero signed for Villanovense of the fourth level.

References

External links

1995 births
Living people
Footballers from Seville
Spanish footballers
Association football wingers
Association football forwards
Segunda División B players
Tercera División players
Sevilla FC C players
UD Almería B players
UD Almería players
Córdoba CF B players
Córdoba CF players
Marbella FC players
CD Don Benito players
Recreativo de Huelva players
CF Villanovense players